MyM (pronounced "My-em") was an 84-page monthly entertainment magazine published in the United Kingdom by the MCM Expo Group. Originally focusing on various aspects of Japanese pop culture, including anime, manga, Japanese cinema and music, cosplay, lolita fashion and video games, it later broadened its reach to become a fully rounded entertainment magazine, including features and interviews on mainstream films, television programmes, comics, books and music.

The magazine's various review sections included releases in those same areas of entertainment, while the news and feature sections also report on films, TV, video games, anime, manga and comics. Regular feature "My Goodies" includes the best toys, gadgets, T-shirts, games, models and merchandise, while fellow regular "Planet Japan" delivers a snapshot of life in that region. The cosplay section included interviews, tips and posters, backed up by a "Fashion Watch" page which highlighted the best J-fashion and beyond. A "MyMag" section originally published readers' reviews but has been superseded by a "Reader's Art" page, which included drawings, illustrations and photography. Meanwhile, regular music interviews featured J-pop and K-pop acts, as well as mainstream acts and big-name film, TV and video game composers.

The first issue of MyM was published on 3 May 2012 and was edited by its publisher, Tarik Alozdi. In October 2012, it was announced that the MCM Expo Group, which runs events such as London MCM Expo, had purchased the magazine. Jody Raynsford edited the magazine for three issues, until news editor Matt Chapman took over as editor from issue 15.

On 23 October 2017, ReedPop acquired MCM.

MyM released its final magazine issue (Issue 71) on 16 February 2018.

Regulars

The Top 10
Counting down the magazine's top 10 choices on a particular subject. Topics usually followed the magazine's interests and included music, films, TV, books, anime, manga and video games. It was introduced by editor Matt Chapman in Issue 31.

Subjects included: obscure manga (Issue 31) board games (Issue 32), video game villains (Issue 33), movie aliens (Issue 34), anime heroines (Issue 35), sidekicks (Issue 36), movie deaths (Issue 37), video game soundtracks (Issue 38), X-Files episodes (Issue 39), Game of Thrones shocks (Issue 40), anime romances (Issue 41), man-versus-nature movies (Issue 42), movie dinosaurs (Issue 43), mecha anime (Issue 44), anti-Christmas movies (Issue 45), Comic-book Rivalries (Issue 46), Free-to-play video games (Issue 47) and Films about films (Issue 48).

My Media
This section interviewed celebrities and asked them to choose their favourites from a wide range of media. It typically included four picks from music, film, TV, books and comics. It was introduced by editor Matt Chapman in Issue 34.

The section included film directors Adam Green (Hatchet), Daniel Simpson (The Rendlesham UFO Incident), Charles Band (Trancers), and Eduardo Sanchez (The Blair Witch Project); actors Sarah Snook (Predestination), Greg Grunberg (Heroes), Robert Llewellyn (Red Dwarf) and Sarah Bolger (Emelie);  voice actors Mark Meer (Mass Effect) and Quinton Flynn (Metal Gear); authors R.A. Salvatore (The DemonWars Saga), Erin M. Evans (Brimstone Angels), Patrick Rothfuss (The Slow Regard of Silent Things) and Paul Tobin (How to Capture an Invisible Cat); and comic-book artist Al Davison.

My Goodies
This section rounded up the best toys, games, action figures, T-shirts, jewellery, gadgets, books and other products, usually with a geeky theme to match the interests of the audience.
 
In Issue 47 this section was sponsored for the first time, by online retailer Jammy Devil Games.

Planet Japan
This two-page spread initially looked at unusual events in Japan and highlighted entertainment from that region. It later switched from being a single page in some issues to a two-page spread in others, giving a snapshot of life in Japan. Model and teacher Katie Carter - AKA Capsule Bunny - often featured, although a column of Japanese travel advice also ran in this section.

Special issues
MyM occasionally dedicated the majority of its feature space to a single topic. The first issue to be billed as a 'special' was Issue 25 (April 2014), which was an Anime Special to coincide with the release of Miyazaki's The Wind Rises and included an extract from Anime: A History by Jonathan Clements. Issue 35 (February 2015) was the next Anime Special (looking at Kantai Collection, anime reboots, an update to the Anime Encyclopedia, the 'Top 10' anime heroines and the best winter streaming series); with Issue 44 also giving over much of its space to the same topic (including an in-depth look at Tatsunoko Production, LeSean Thomas on his Cannon Busters pilot, the 'Top 10' mecha anime shows, new autumn anime streaming shows and interviews from Scotland Loves Anime).

Issue 26 (May 2014) was a Monster Special and featured exclusive Godzilla art on its cover, along with a feature on the Godzilla reboot and retrospectives on that monster and fellow Kaiju Gamera and Daimajin, plus an interview with Willow Creek director Bobcat Goldthwait.

Meanwhile, Issue 38 (May 2015) was a Music Special that included features on visual kei bands, a history of K-pop, a Pitch Perfect 2 interview, an in-depth look at the Burning Man festival, an interview with Greg Grunberg of the Band From TV, My Chemical Romance's Frank Iero on his solo album and a countdown of the 'Top 10' videogame soundtracks, as well as news on Disney's Tangled musical, the Glastonbury festival and J-rock events in London.

MyM Mascot

The official mascot of MyM was an angel called Mya Tenshi. She appeared on page three of the magazine, above the editor's letter. She appeared in the following issues: 1–9; 11; 13–17; 19–21; 23; 26; and 30–60.

She has been drawn in many forms by artists who are MyM readers, including: 
● James Clarkson (Issues 1, 3, 8, 14, 16, 35) ● Donna Evans (Issues 2 and 9) ● Ruusu-Chan (Issues 4, 35) ● Michelle Dunning (Issue 5) ● Tienette Setou (Issues 6, 30, 35) ● Fiona Whitton (Issue 7) ● Ellen Cahill (Issues 11 and 34) ● Emily McGorman (Issues 13, 15, 20, 23, 26, 35) ● Mike Kay (Issues 17, 19, 21, 32, 33, 35, 42, 52, 57) ● Lucy crew (Issue 37) ● Claire Courtney (Issues 38, 50) ● Katya Busuttil (Issue 39) ● Rey Curley (Issues 41 and 49) ● Alexandra Dragusanu (Issues 44, 51) ● Barry Spiers (Issues 45, 54) ● Ben Farnell (Issues 46, 58) ● David Milburn (Issue 47) ● Hannah Meyers (Issue 48) ● Brett Knapp (Issue 53) ● Mark Mitchell (Issue 56)

A number of professional artists have also drawn Mya Tenshi. As a promotion for the web series Zombies On Ramsay Street in Issue 31, illustrator Tim Molloy zombified James Clarkson's version of Mya Tenshi.  This zombie image was used again in Issues 36, 55 and 67, as the magazine contained a number of horror-related features or it fitted in with Halloween. Issue 38 saw MCMBuzz.com artist Claire Courtney draw Mya Tenshi with a birthday cake, to celebrate the magazine's third anniversary. In Issue 40, illustrator Phil Hankinson created an abstract version of Mya Tenshi using a digital stylus and an iPad Mini. Hankinson had reviewed the Wacom Intuos Creative Stylus 2 in the same issue. And in Issue 43, artist Chris Jones created an image using Kuretake art products.

In Issue 35 MyM ran images by a number of different artists to illustrate the different ways Mya Tenshi had been drawn by the magazine's readers. It also called for new submissions in the magazine and online, offering a goodie bag as a prize for successful submissions. In Issue 43 a similar promotion was run in conjunction with art supplies company Kuretake, with readers offered the chance to win a selection of Kuretake's products.

Issue contents

See also
Empire magazine
 List of film periodicals
List of manga magazines published outside of Japan
Neo
SFX
Total Film

References

External links
MyMBuzz

Anime and manga magazines
Film magazines published in the United Kingdom
Monthly magazines published in the United Kingdom
Music magazines published in the United Kingdom
Game magazines
Magazines established in 2012
Magazines disestablished in 2018
Defunct magazines published in the United Kingdom